The LP (from "long playing" or "long play") is an analog sound storage medium, a phonograph record format characterized by: a speed of  rpm; a 12- or 10-inch (30- or 25-cm) diameter; use of the "microgroove" groove specification; and a vinyl (a copolymer of vinyl chloride acetate) composition disk. Introduced by Columbia in 1948, it was soon adopted as a new standard by the entire record industry. Apart from a few relatively minor refinements and the important later addition of stereophonic sound, it remained the standard format for record albums (during a period in popular music known as the album era) until its gradual replacement from the 1980s to the early 2000s, first by cassettes, then by compact discs, and finally by digital music distribution.

Beginning in the late 2000s, the LP has experienced a resurgence in popularity.

Format advantages
At the time the LP was introduced, nearly all phonograph records for home use were made of an abrasive (and therefore noisy) shellac compound, employed a much larger groove, and played at approximately 78 revolutions per minute (rpm), limiting the playing time of a 12-inch diameter record to less than five minutes per side. The new product was a 12- or 10-inch (30 or 25 cm) fine-grooved disc made of PVC ("vinyl") and played with a smaller-tipped "microgroove" stylus at a speed of  rpm. Each side of a 12-inch LP could play for about 22 minutes.

History

Soundtrack discs

By mid-1931 all motion picture studios were recording on optical soundtracks, but sets of soundtrack discs, mastered by dubbing from the optical tracks and scaled down to 12 inches to cut costs, were made as late as 1936 for distribution to theaters still equipped with disc-only sound projectors.

Radio transcription discs
Unless the quantity required was very small, pressed discs were a more economical medium for distributing high-quality audio than tape, and CD mastering was, in the early years of that technology, very expensive, so the use of LP-format transcription discs continued into the 1990s. The King Biscuit Flower Hour is a late example, as are Westwood One's The Beatle Years and Doctor Demento programs, which were sent to stations on LP at least through 1992.

RCA Victor
RCA Victor introduced an early version of a long-playing record for home use in September 1931. These "Program Transcription" discs, as Victor called them, played at  rpm and used a somewhat finer and more closely spaced groove than typical 78s. They were to be played with a special "Chromium Orange" chrome-plated steel needle. The 10-inch discs, mostly used for popular and light classical music, were normally pressed in shellac, but the 12-inch discs, mostly used for "serious" classical music, were pressed in Victor's new vinyl-based "Victrolac" compound, which provided a much quieter playing surface. These records could hold up to 15 minutes per side. Beethoven's Fifth Symphony, performed by the Philadelphia Orchestra under Leopold Stokowski, was the first 12-inch recording issued. Compton Pakensham, reviewing the event in The New York Times wrote, "What we were not prepared for was the quality of reproduction...incomparably fuller."

Columbia
CBS Laboratories head research scientist Peter Goldmark led Columbia's team to develop a phonograph record that would hold at least 20 minutes per side. Although Goldmark was the chief scientist who selected the team, he delegated most of the experimental work to William S. Bachman, whom Goldmark had lured from General Electric, and Howard H. Scott.

Research began in 1939, was suspended during World War II, and then resumed in 1945. The initial release of 133 recordings were: 85 12-inch classical LPs (ML 4001 to 4085), 26 10-inch classics (ML 2001 to 2026), eighteen 10-inch popular numbers (CL 6001 to 6018), and four 10-inch juvenile records (JL 8001 to 8004). According to the 1949 Columbia catalog, issued September 1948, the first twelve-inch LP was Mendelssohn's Concerto in E Minor by Nathan Milstein on the violin with the New York Philharmonic, conducted by Bruno Walter (ML 4001). Three ten-inch series were released: 'popular', starting with the reissue of The Voice of Frank Sinatra (CL 6001); 'classical', numbering from Beethoven's 8th symphony (ML 2001), and 'juvenile', commencing with Nursery Songs by Gene Kelly (JL 8001). Also released at this time were a pair of 2-LP sets, Puccini's La Bohème (SL-1) and Humperdinck's Hansel & Gretel (SL-2). All 12-inch pressings were of 220 grams vinyl. Columbia may have planned for the Bach album ML 4002 to be the first since the releases came in alphabetical order by composer (the first 54 LPS, ML 4002 thru ML 4055, are in order from Bach to Tchaikowsky)  Nathan Milstein was very popular in the 1940s, however, so his performance of the Mendelssohn concerto was moved to ML 4001.

Public reception
When the LP was introduced in 1948, the 78 was the conventional format for phonograph records. By 1952, 78s still accounted for slightly more than half of the units sold in the United States, and just under half of the dollar sales. The 45, oriented toward the single song, accounted for just over 30% of unit sales and just over 25% of dollar sales. The LP represented not quite 17% of unit sales and just over 26% of dollar sales.

Ten years after their introduction, the share of unit sales for LPs in the US was almost 25%, and of dollar sales 58%. Most of the remainder was taken up by the 45; 78s accounted for only 2% of unit sales and 1% of dollar sales. 

The popularity of the LP ushered in the "Album Era" of English-language popular music, beginning in the late 1950s, as performers took advantage of the longer playing time to create coherent themes or concept albums. "The rise of the LP as a form—as an artistic entity, as they used to say—has complicated how we perceive and remember what was once the most evanescent of the arts", Robert Christgau wrote in Christgau's Record Guide: Rock Albums of the Seventies (1981). "The album may prove a '70s totem—briefer configurations were making a comeback by decade's end. But for the '70s it will remain the basic musical unit, and that's OK with me. I've found over the years that the long-playing record, with its twenty-minute sides and four-to-six compositions/performances per side, suits my habits of concentration perfectly."

Although the popularity of LPs began to decline in the late 1970s with the advent of Compact Cassettes, and later compact discs, the LP survives as a format to the present day. Vinyl LP records enjoyed a resurgence in the early 2010s. Vinyl sales in the UK reached 2.8 million in 2012. US vinyl sales in 2017 reached 15.6 million and 27 million for 2020.

Competing formats
Reel-to-reel magnetic tape recorders posed a new challenge to the LP in the 1950s, but the higher cost of pre-recorded tapes was one of several factors that confined tape to a niche market. Cartridge and cassette tapes were more convenient and less expensive than reel-to-reel tapes, and they became popular for use in automobiles beginning in the mid-1960s. The LP was not seriously challenged as the primary medium for listening to recorded music at home until the 1970s, however, when the audio quality of the cassette was greatly improved by better tape formulations and noise-reduction systems. By 1983, cassettes were outselling LPs in the US.

The Compact Disc (CD) was introduced in 1982. It offered a recording that was, theoretically, completely noiseless and not audibly degraded by repeated playing or slight scuffs and scratches. At first, the much higher prices of CDs and CD players limited their target market to affluent early adopters and audiophiles; but prices came down, and by 1988 CDs outsold LPs. The CD became the top-selling format, over cassettes, in 1992.

Along with phonograph records in other formats, some of which were made of other materials, LPs are now widely referred to simply as "vinyl". Since the late 1990s there has been a vinyl revival. Demand has increased in niche markets, particularly among audiophiles, DJs, and fans of indie music, but most music sales as of 2018 came from online downloads and online streaming because of their availability, convenience, and price.

Playing time
With the advent of sound film or "talkies", the need for greater storage space made  rpm records more appealing. Soundtracks – played on records synchronized to movie projectors in theatres – could not fit onto the mere five minutes per side that 78s offered. When initially introduced, 12-inch LPs played for a maximum of about 23 minutes per side, 10-inch records for around 15. They were not an immediate success, however, as they were released during the height of the Great Depression, and seemed frivolous to the many impoverished of the time. It wasn't until "microgroove" was developed by Columbia Records in 1948 that Long Players (LPs) reached their maximum playtime, which has continued to modern times.

Economics and tastes initially determined which kind of music was available on each format. Recording company executives believed upscale classical music fans would be eager to hear a Beethoven symphony or a Mozart concerto without having to flip over multiple, four-minute-per-side 78s, and that pop music fans, who were used to listening to one song at a time, would find the shorter time of the 10-inch LP sufficient. As a result, the 12-inch format was reserved solely for higher-priced classical recordings and Broadway shows. Popular music continued to appear only on 10-inch records.

Their beliefs were wrong. By the mid-1950s, the 10-inch LP, like its similarly sized 78 rpm cousin, lost the format war and was discontinued. Ten-inch records briefly reappeared as mini-LPs in the late 1970s and early 1980s in the United States and Australia as a marketing alternative.

Exceptions

Groove
Thin, closely spaced spiral grooves that allowed for increased playing time on a  rpm microgroove LP led to a faint pre-echo warning of upcoming loud sounds. The cutting stylus unavoidably transferred some of the subsequent groove wall's impulse signal into the previous groove wall. It was discernible by some listeners throughout certain recordings but a quiet passage followed by a loud sound would allow anyone to hear a faint pre-echo of the loud sound occurring 1.8 seconds ahead of time.

Fidelity and formats

The following are some significant advances in the format:

 Helium-cooled cutting heads that could withstand higher levels of high frequencies (Neumann SX68); previously, the cutting engineer had to reduce the HF content of the signal sent to the record cutting head, otherwise the delicate coils could burn out
 Elliptical stylus marketed by several manufacturers at the end of the 1960s
 Cartridges that operate at lower tracking forces (2.0 grams / 20 mN), beginning from the mid-1960s
 Half-speed and one-third-speed record cutting, which extends the usable bandwidth of the record
 Longer-lasting, antistatic record compounds (e.g.: RCA Dynaflex, Q-540)
 More advanced stylus tip shapes (Shibata, Van den Hul, MicroLine, etc.)
 Direct metal mastering
 Noise-reduction (CX encoding, dbx encoding), starting from 1973
 In the 1970s, quadraphonic sound (four-channel) records became available in both discrete and matrix formats. These did not achieve the popularity of stereo records due to the expense of consumer playback equipment, competing and incompatible quad recording standards, and a lack of quality in quad-remix releases.

The composition of vinyl used to press records (a blend of polyvinyl chloride and polyvinyl acetate) has varied considerably over the years. Virgin vinyl is preferred, but during the 1970s energy crisis, it became commonplace to use recycled vinyl. Sound quality suffered, with increased ticks, pops, and other surface noises. 

In 2018, an Austrian startup, Rebeat Innovation GmBH, received 4.8 million in funding to develop high definition vinyl records that purport to contain longer play times, louder volumes and higher fidelity than conventional vinyl LPs. Rebeat Innovation, headed by CEO Günter Loibl, has called the format 'HD Vinyl'. The HD process works by converting audio to a digital 3D topography map that is then inscribed onto the vinyl stamper via lasers, resulting in less loss of information. Many critics have expressed skepticism regarding the cost and quality of HD records.

In May 2019, at the Making Vinyl conference in Berlin, Loibl unveiled the Perfect Groove software for creating 3D topographic audio data files. This is a critical step in the production of HD Vinyl stampers, as they provide the map for subsequent laser-engraving.  The audio engineering software was created with mastering engineers Scott Hull and Darcy Proper, a four-time Grammy winner. The demonstration offered the first simulations of what HD Vinyl records are likely to sound like, ahead of actual HD vinyl physical record production. Loibl discussed the Perfect Groove software at a presentation titled "Vinyl 4.0 The next generation of making records" before offering demonstrations to attendees.

See also

 Album cover
 Conservation and restoration of vinyl discs

References

External links

 "The History Of The LP Record". Classical33.co.uk

1948 in music
1948 in technology
Album types
Audio storage
Audiovisual introductions in 1948
Products introduced in 1948
Recorded music